Agkonia miranda is a moth of the subfamily Arctiinae. It was described by George Hampson in 1900. It is found in Bolivia.

References

Moths described in 1900
Lithosiini
Moths of South America